Kenneth Vrest Orton (September 3, 1897 – December 2, 1986) was a writer and businessman who co-founded the Vermont Country Store with his wife, Mildred Ellen Orton.

Life
Orton was born to and on September 3, 1897, in Hardwick, Vermont. His family later moved to his grandfather's residence in North Calais. There, he participated in his grandfather's business. He served as a Medical Corps sergeant in France during World War I.

In 1925, he moved to New York, where he came into contact with H. L. Mencken's American Mercury Magazine, and he worked as a publicist. Over the course of the 1920s and 1930s, he became friends with several authors, including Theodore Dreiser, Sinclair Lewis, and Robert Frost. In the early 1920s, he went to Harvard University and Brown University. During the 1920s, he developed a friendship with the writer H. P. Lovecraft, and joined a literary circle, the Kalem Club. By this time, he had come to dislike New York. He invited Lovecraft to his family farm in 1928. He wished to return to Vermont, and convinced Lovecraft to join him in his trip. They performed manual labor, and met with other writers. Orton also wrote an article in the Brattleboro Reformer about Lovecraft. In 1936, he married Mildred Ellen Orton. In the 1930s, he settled in Weston, Vermont, where he wrote articles and essays for local newspapers. During World War II, he served in a public relations capacity. In 1946, he bought a former country inn and co-founded the Vermont Country Store with his wife on the property. This store serves as both a specialty store and a repository for historical documents and objects related to Vermont. He expressed conservative political views. He died on December 2, 1986, in Springfield Hospital.

References

Sources 

 
 
 
 
 
 
 
 
 
 
 

1897 births
1986 deaths
American business executives
American company founders
American grocers
American male essayists
American male journalists
American military personnel of World War II
American_publicists
Brown University alumni
Harvard University alumni
Retail company founders
United States Army personnel of World War I
United States Army non-commissioned officers